The deep branch of the perineal nerve (or muscular branches) is a nerve of the perineum. It is a branch of the perineal nerve, from the pudendal nerve. It supplies the superficial transverse perineal muscle, bulbospongiosus muscle, ischiocavernosus muscle, the bulb of penis, levator ani, and the external anal sphincter.

Structure 
The deep branch of the perineal nerve is a branch of the perineal nerve, itself a branch of the pudendal nerve. It pierces the medial wall of the pudendal canal.

The dorsal nerve of the penis for males and the dorsal nerve of the clitoris for females is the terminal branch of the pudendal nerve.

Function 
The deep branch of the perineal nerve supplies the muscles of the perineum. These include superficial transverse perineal muscle, bulbospongiosus muscle, ischiocavernosus muscle, the bulb of penis. It also supplies levator ani, and the external anal sphincter.

References

External links 
  - "The Female Perineum: The Perineal Nerve"
 
 https://web.archive.org/web/20071101125123/http://anatomy.med.umich.edu/reproductive_system/perineum_ans.html

Nerves of the lower limb and lower torso